The Italian Owl is one of the many breeds of fancy pigeons developed over years, often decades, of selective breeding. Like other breeds of fancy pigeons, Italian Owls are descendants of the domesticated rock pigeon (Columba livia). Italian Owls are noted for their proud horizontal stance, relatively small size compared with many other fancy breeds, broad and rounded breast that displays a  prominent chest frill, a somewhat flat head that is rounded at the front and back, a rather short tail, and orange eyes unless a bird is white or pied, in which cases the eyes are "bull" (black). Healthy Italian Owls are perky birds that stand on their toes and give the appearance that they are ready to spring forward. The breed is represented in the United States by the Valencian Figurita and Italian Owl Club (https://sites.google.com/site/figuritaanditalianowlclub/), and in Germany by the Sonderverein der Züchter Italienische Mövchen (http://www.italienische-moevchen.de/index_website.html). Italian Owls are bred in many beautiful colors. These include blue, silver, red, and yellow in the major three patterns of check, barred and bar-less; recessive reds, yellows and whites (these recessive birds are completely red, yellow or white and have no pattern); spread blacks (completely black birds); pied in the major colors and in various patterns; gold-collared birds in the major colors and patterns; grizzle; and almond, andalusian and indigo. Photographs of the breed in these various colors and lists of breeders can be found at the speciality club web sites.

See also 
List of pigeon breeds

References

Pigeon breeds
Pigeon breeds originating in Italy